Peter Englund (born 4 February 1950, Stockholm), is a Swedish economist. He was professor at Uppsala University 1988-1998 and is professor at the Stockholm School of Economics since 1998.

Englund is a member of the Royal Swedish Academy of Engineering Sciences since 1997, and is a member of the Committee for the Prize in Economic Sciences in Memory of Alfred Nobel, the so-called "Nobel Prize in Economics". Using mostly well-developed approaches, he researched causal links pertaining to constitution of office space pricing.

References

External links 

1950 births
Living people
Swedish economists
Academic staff of Uppsala University
Academic staff of the Stockholm School of Economics
Members of the Royal Swedish Academy of Engineering Sciences